The Vinxtbach is a stream of Rhineland-Palatinate, Germany.

The name Vinxt is derived from the Latin term finis, which means "border". In ancient Rome, the Vinxtbach marked the border between the provinces Germania Inferior and Germania Superior. In times of the Middle Ages, it was the border between the duchies of Lower Lorraine and Upper Lorraine. Today the Vinxtbach forms a dialect boundary, the "Vinxtbach line" (Vinxtbachlinie): north of the Vinxtbach the Ripuarian dialects are spoken, south of it, the Moselle Franconian dialects.

See also 
List of rivers of Rhineland-Palatinate

References

External links 

 AW Wiki - Vinxtbach
 Ad fines (Vinxtbach)

Rivers of Rhineland-Palatinate
Rivers of the Eifel
Ahrweiler (district)
Germania Inferior
Germania Superior
Heritage sites in Rhineland-Palatinate
Rivers of Germany